The 2016 Pan American Women's Youth Handball Championship was held in the city of Santiago, Chile from 12 to 16 April 2016. It acts as the American qualifying tournament for the 2016 Women's Youth World Handball Championship.

Results

Round robin

Final standing

Awards
All-star team
Goalkeeper:  Renata Arruda
Right Wing:  Ayelén García
Right Back:  Gabriela Bitolo
Playmaker:  Rocio Gomez
Left Back:  Gilvana Nogueira
Left Wing:  María Paula Fernández
Pivot:  Catalina Moreno

References

External links
Page of the championship on PATHF website

Pan American Women's Youth Handball Championship
Pan American Women's Youth Handball Championship
Hand
2016 in youth sport
P
Youth sport in Chile